James Sylvester Scott (February 12, 1885 – August 30, 1938) was an American ragtime composer and pianist. He is regarded as one of the "Big Three" composers of classical ragtime along with Scott Joplin and Joseph Lamb.

Life and career
He was born in Neosho, Missouri to James Scott, Sr. and Molly Thomas Scott, both former slaves. In 1901 his family moved to Carthage, Missouri, where he attended Lincoln High School. In 1902 he began working at the music store of Charles L. Dumars, first washing windows, then demonstrating music at the piano as a song plugger, including his own pieces. Demand for his music convinced Dumars to print the first of Scott's published compositions, "A Summer Breeze - March and Two Step", in 1903. By 1904, two more compositions by Scott, "Fascinator March" and "On the Pike March" were published and sold well, but not enough to keep Dumars in business and soon the company ceased publishing.

Ragtime Historians Rudi Blesh and Harriet Janis recount that Scott went to St. Louis, Missouri in search of his idol Scott Joplin in 1905. He located Joplin and asked if he would listen to one of his ragtime compositions. Upon hearing the rag, Joplin introduced him to his own publisher, John Stillwell Stark, and recommended he publish the work. Stark published the rag a year later as "Frog Legs Rag". It quickly became a hit and was second in sales in the Stark catalogue only to that of Joplin's own "Maple Leaf Rag". Scott became a regular contributor to the Stark catalogue until 1922.

In 1914 Scott moved to Kansas City, Missouri, where he married Nora Johnson, taught music, and accompanied silent movies as an organist and arranger at the Panama Theater. Those that knew him recall that theater work was a large part of his activity. His cousin Patsy Thomas remembers, "Everybody called him 'Little Professor' He always walked rapidly, looking at the ground - would pass you on the street and never see you - seemed always deep in thought."

In the last years of his life, Scott busied himself with teaching, composing and leading an eight-piece band that played for various beer parks and movie theaters in the area. With the arrival of sound movies, however, his fortunes declined. He lost his theater work, his wife died without child, and his health deteriorated. He moved in with his cousin Ruth Callahan in Kansas City, Kansas, and even though was suffering from chronic dropsy, he continued to compose and play piano. Scott died at Douglas Hospital on August 30, 1938 at age 52 and was laid beside his wife in Westlawn Cemetery.

Scott's best-known compositions include Climax Rag, Frog Legs Rag, Grace and Beauty, Ophelia Rag and The Ragtime Oriole.

Scott was a cousin of blues singer Ada Brown.

Aftermath

In the Third Season of the HBO series Boardwalk Empire, Scott is portrayed by an uncredited actor in the episode "Spaghetti and Coffee".

Published works
See list of compositions by James Scott

See also
List of ragtime composers

References

DeVeaux, Scott and William Howland Kenney (1992) The Music of James Scott, Smithsonian Institution Press.

External links

https://web.archive.org/web/20160303165917/http://www.umkc.edu/orgs/kcjazz/jazzfolk/scotj_00.htm James Scott on the Kansas City Jazz site
"Perfessor" Bill Edwards plays Scott compositions and provides background on many of his works

James Scott: Innovative American Composer

Sheet music 

1885 births
1938 deaths
20th-century African-American musicians
20th-century American composers
20th-century American male musicians
20th-century American pianists
African-American composers
African-American male composers
African-American music educators
African-American pianists
American bandleaders
American male pianists
American music arrangers
American music educators
American ragtime musicians
Composers for piano
Educators from Missouri
Musicians from Missouri
People from Carthage, Missouri
People from Neosho, Missouri
Ragtime composers
Ragtime pianists